Rodney John Clayden (born 1945), is a male former swimmer who competed for England.

Swimming career
He represented England in the 110 and 220 yards backstroke, at the 1962 British Empire and Commonwealth Games in Perth, Western Australia.

He was a member of the York City Swimming Club.

References

English male swimmers
1945 births
Swimmers at the 1962 British Empire and Commonwealth Games
Living people
Commonwealth Games medallists in swimming
Commonwealth Games bronze medallists for England
Medallists at the 1962 British Empire and Commonwealth Games